| tries = {{#expr:
 + 6 + 11 + 8 + 7 + 6 + 8 + 5 + 7
 + 4 + 5 + 9 + 7 + 6 + 7 + 10
 + 4 + 8 + 10 + 13 + 9 + 9 + 10
 + 6 + 5 + 9 + 8 + 6 + 6 + 5 + 6
 + 2 + 3 + 3 + 5 + 3 + 6 + 7 + 2
 + 7 + 4 + 9 + 7 + 11 + 11 + 3 + 10
 + 12 + 9 + 9 + 10 + 3 + 5 + 10 + 12
 + 4 + 3 + 18 + 6 + 5 + 3 + 13 + 9 
 + 9 + 5 + 10 + 6 + 6 + 6 + 13 + 9
 + 7
 + 6 + 7 + 10 + 7 + 10 + 6 + 13 
 + 3 + 6 + 7 + 5 + 9 + 11 + 8 + 7
 + 5 + 6 + 9 + 5 + 3 + 5 + 2
 + 5 + 12 + 10 + 8 + 7 + 9 + 6
 + 9 + 4 + 9 + 7 + 7 + 2 + 10 
 + 6 + 4 + 8 + 8 + 6  
 + 3 + 2 + 9 + 9 + 7 + 4 
 + 12 + 6 + 6 + 6 + 9 + 8 + 5 + 8 
 + 3 + 9 + 3 + 8 + 10 + 6 + 7 + 6 
 + 2 + 2 + 8 + 12 + 7 + 7 + 7 
 + 12 + 7 + 7 + 9 + 9
 + 7 + 11 + 8 + 9 + 8 + 9 + 5 + 13 
 + 0 + 3 + 14 + 4 + 3 + 5 + 9 + 6 
 + 6 + 5 + 14 + 7 + 11 + 5 + 14 + 8 
 + 7 + 8 + 10 + 4 + 11 + 8 + 4 + 11 
 + 8 + 9 + 8 + 5 + 14 + 8 + 8 + 14 
 + 4 + 4 + 8
 + 6 + 13 + 7 + 9 + 6 + 11 + 8 + 9 
 + 5 + 9 + 10 + 7 + 10 + 6 + 9 + 6 
 + 5 + 10 + 9 + 11 + 9 + 10 + 10 + 8 
 + 11 + 2 + 14 + 6 + 5 + 8 + 13 
 + 10 + 8 + 10 + 8 + 11 + 9 + 11 + 6
 + 9 + 10 + 10 + 11 + 7 + 9 + 12 + 11 
 + 9
}}
| top point scorer = 310 – Sam Morley (Esher)
| top try scorer   = 22 – Finlay Sharp (Clifton)
| prevseason       = 2019–20
| nextseason       = 2022–23 (2 East)2022–23 (2 West)
}}

The 2021–22 National League 2 South was the twelfth and final season (34th overall) of the fourth tier (south) of the English domestic rugby union competitions since the professionalised format of the second division was introduced.

Structure
The league consisted of sixteen teams with all the teams playing each other on a home and away basis to make a total of thirty matches each. As originally planned there was one promotion place and one relegation place. The champions would be promoted to the 2022–23 National League 1 and the last team relegated to the most appropriate tier five league depending on the geographical location of the team.

The results of the matches contribute points to the league as follows:
 4 points are awarded for a win
 2 points are awarded for a draw
 0 points are awarded for a loss, however
 1 losing (bonus) point is awarded to a team that loses a match by 7 points or fewer
 1 additional (bonus) point is awarded to a team scoring 4 tries or more in a match.

Participating teams and locations
Eleven of the teams listed below participated in the 2019–20 National League 2 North season. The 2019–20 champions, Taunton Titans, and runner-up, Tonbridge Juddians were promoted to the 2021–22 National League 1, replacing Canterbury who were relegated from the 2019–20 National League 1. The three teams relegated from National League 2 South the previous season were Sutton & Epsom (London & South East Premier), and Bournemouth and Old Redcliffians (both South-West Premier). The promoted teams were Barnstaple (champions of South West Premier), while Rochford Hundred and Guernsey Raiders come up as champions and runner-up of London & South East Premier. In order to address an imbalance of teams, Hinckley were level transferred to the 2021–22 National League 2 South as the most appropriate located team in terms of access to the southern sides.

The Rugby Football Union restructured the leagues after the 2021–22 season and National 2 South was discontinued. Fifteen of the sixteen teams were placed into one of the other level four leagues for 2022–23. Barnes, Bury St. Edmunds, Canterbury, Guernsey Raiders, Henley Hawks, Old Albanian, Rochford Hundred, Westcliff and Worthing Raiders were transferred to the newly-created National League 2 East while Barnstaple, Clifton, Dings Crusaders, Hinckley, Leicester Lions and Redruth were transferred to another new level four league, National League 2 West. The champions Esher were promoted to National League 1. No teams were relegated to level five.

League table

Fixtures & results
Fixtures for the season were announced by the RFU on 4 May 2021.

Round 1

Round 2

Round 3

Round 4

Round 5

Round 6

Round 7

Round 8

Round 9

Round 2 (rescheduled match)

Round 10

Round 11

Round 12

Round 13

Round 14

Round 15

Round 16

Round 17

Round 18

Round 19

Round 3, 10, 12, 15 & 16 (rescheduled matches)

Round 20

Round 21

Round 22

Round 23

Round 24

Rescheduled matches

Round 25

Round 26

Round 27

Round 28

Round 29

Round 30

Rescheduled matches

See also
 2021–22 National League 1
 2021–22 National League 2 North

Notes

References

External links
 NCA Rugby

2021–22
4S